Mochizuki sensei might refer to:

 Minoru Mochizuki (1907–2003), a Japanese martial artist
 Hiroo Mochizuki (born 1936), the son of Minoru Mochizuki